The Lansing Lancers were a professional ice hockey team playing in the International Hockey League. They were based in Lansing, Michigan and played their games at Metro Ice Arena. They were a member of the league during the 1974–1975 season, after moving from Toledo, Ohio, where it played as the Toledo Blades from 1963 to 1970, and the Toledo Hornets from 1970 to 1974. The team suspended operations during the season on January 16, 1975. They had played only forty-one out of seventy-five games.

Results

References 

International Hockey League (1945–2001) teams
Sports in Lansing, Michigan
Defunct ice hockey teams in the United States
Ice hockey clubs established in 1974
Ice hockey clubs disestablished in 1975
Professional ice hockey teams in Michigan